The bank officially known as the Aberystwith and Tregaron Bank was established at Aberystwyth, Cardiganshire in the beginning of the 19th century and was locally known as ‘Banc y Ddafad Ddu’, because the bank notes were imprinted with an engraving of a black sheep. The Bank later established a branch at Tregaron

In the 1960s and 1970s the Bank's notes inspired a Mr Richard Williams to imitate them.

Banknotes
The notes were issued for ten shillings, £1, £2 and up to £10. The number of sheep on the engraving corresponded to the number of pounds represented by the bank note, though the £5 and £10 notes bore respectively one ram and two rams. The ten shilling note was decorated with an illustration of a lamb.

The earliest note appears to have been issued on 1 October 1810 and bears the signature of William Davies on behalf of Evans, Jones, Davies & Co.  A number of notes have been preserved signed either by John Evans or William Davies. The notes are all dated within the period 1810 to 1814.

Original Black Sheep bank notes are held by the British Museum, and Ceredigion Museum. Llanidloes Museum holds original promissory notes issued by the Bank.

Members of the bank
The members of the bank were John Evans of Penygraig, Aberystwyth, Joseph Jones and William Davies, and their London agents at that date were Veres, Smart, Baron & Co.

A memorial tablet to John Evans can be found at Llanbadarn Fawr churchyard, near Aberystwyth.

Tregaron branch
The bank opened a branch in Tregaron in 1810, as a result of the thriving local economy based on wool, droving, agriculture, and supporting businesses, such as blacksmiths and public houses.

The proprietor of the Gold Shop in Tregaron obtained an original Black Sheep bank note after a 15-year wait. The bank note was found in the papers of a Carmarthen solicitor.

Liquidation
The bank was in trouble by 1811 as an advert in the Carmarthen Journal recorded: Evans, Jones, Davies and Co, Bankers of the Aberystwith and Tregaron Bank beg leave to inform the public that their bank has been open for business since its commencement and will continue so, notwithstanding an attempt lately made to injure it by inveterate enemies.

In 1815 it went into liquidation. Aberystwyth Old Bank. Messrs Jones, Davies and Williams beg to inform the public that the dissolution of their form has taken place by mutual consent, and they will feel obliged by the holders of their local notes sending them for payment to their Banking house, at Aberystwyith and those made payable in London to the House of Sir James Esdaile and Co. Aberystwyth Old bank, August 10, 1815.

Debts were still due to the bank in 1820. Aberystwith and Tregaron Bank. Evans, Jones and Davies Bankruptcy (public notice). Any debts to the above to be paid by 1 November 1820 to William Leyburn of Aberystwyth or Thomas Jones, ropemaker. 

A number of notes bear a memorandum stamped across the face of the note stating that they had been exhibited before G. Bonsall under a commission of bankruptcy against the firm, and that a first dividend of 6s. 8d. in the £ had been paid. The memorandum does not bear a date, but it appears that no other dividend was received by the owners of the notes.

Imitation
During the late 1960s and early 1970s  Richard Hugh Williams of Llandudno issued paper money which bore a 2d (2 "old" pence) Duty Stamp, which R H Williams paid for.  This meant, in his view, that the notes were “officially” recognised., although it should be pointed out that ordinary cheques were also subject to such stamping until early 1971.

The first issues were made by "y Prif Trysorfa Cymru Cyfyngedig" ("the Chief Treasury of Wales Ltd”), and the significance of this company name appears to have been overlooked initially by the Stamp Office, as the notes were written in Welsh. It is unlikely that the notes would have been officially stamped - or even that registration of such a company name would have been allowed - if this had been recognised.
  
When officials demanded that the company name be changed, Williams changed it to "Cwmni y Ddafad Ddu Gymreig Cyfyngedig" (the “Black Sheep Company Ltd”), a name inspired by the bank note issues of the Aberystwith & Tregaron Bank. Again, it seems that the Stamp Office was unaware of this historical precedent and the significance of the name. They duly officially stamped these issues also.

Other Aberystwyth banks
Other Aberystwyth banks include Bank Y Llong and Aberystwyth Provident Bank for Savings, both had branches on Bridge Street, Aberystwyth.

See also

 Banknotes of the Chief Treasury of Wales Limited
 Banknotes of the Black Sheep Company of Wales Limited

References

External links
Ceredigion County Council, Museum Collection
 Archives Wales, National Library of Wales, Glan Paith Papers
 World Time Lines, The Drovers' Roads
 Aberystwyth Guide

History of Wales
Defunct banks of Wales
Banks established in 1810
Banks disestablished in 1815
Companies based in Ceredigion
Former banknote issuers of the United Kingdom
1815 disestablishments in Wales
1810 establishments in Wales
British companies established in 1810